Grayson is a unincorporated community in Stanislaus County, California, United States. The population was 952 at the 2010 census, down from 1,077 at the 2000 census. For statistical purposes, the United States Census Bureau has defined Grayson as a census-designated place (CDP). It is part of the Modesto Metropolitan Statistical Area.

History
Grayson or Graysonville or Grayson City was founded by a company of seven  men, which included Andrew Jackson Grayson (1818–1869).  Grayson, a native of Louisiana, brought his family to California in 1846, and was active in the Mexican–American War.  He was a self-taught watercolor painter and an authority of Pacific Coast birds.

Graysonville was a steamboat landing on the San Joaquin River from the time of the California Gold Rush until river traffic ended as the water was taken for agriculture.

Geography

The community is at the convergence of the San Joaquin and Tuolumne rivers.

Demographics

2010
The 2010 United States Census reported that Grayson had a population of 952. The racial makeup of Grayson was 455 (47.8%) White, 17 (1.8%) African American, 4 (0.4%) Native American, 3 (0.3%) Asian, 0 (0.0%) Pacific Islander, 417 (43.8%) from other races, and 56 (5.9%) from two or more races. Hispanic or Latino of any race were 819 persons (86.0%).

The Census reported that 952 people (100% of the population) lived in households, 0 (0%) lived in non-institutionalized group quarters, and 0 (0%) were institutionalized.

There were 250 households, out of which 143 (57.2%) had children under the age of 18 living in them, 154 (61.6%) were opposite-sex married couples living together, 38 (15.2%) had a female householder with no husband present, 25 (10.0%) had a male householder with no wife present.  There were 18 (7.2%) unmarried opposite-sex partnerships, and 0 (0%) same-sex married couples or partnerships. 22 households (8.8%) were made up of individuals, and 6 (2.4%) had someone living alone who was 65 years of age or older. The average household size was 3.81.  There were 217 families (86.8% of all households); the average family size was 4.03.

The population was spread out, with 318 people (33.4%) under the age of 18, 104 people (10.9%) aged 18 to 24, 260 people (27.3%) aged 25 to 44, 204 people (21.4%) aged 45 to 64, and 66 people (6.9%) who were 65 years of age or older.  The median age was 29.0 years. For every 100 females, there were 114.4 males.  For every 100 females age 18 and over, there were 108.6 males.

The homeowner vacancy rate was 4.7%; the rental vacancy rate was 11.9%.  578 people (60.7% of the population) lived in owner-occupied housing units and 374 people (39.3%) lived in rental housing units.

2000
As of the census of 2000, there were 1,077 people, 274 households, and 243 families residing in the CDP. The racial makeup of the CDP was 41.69% White, 1.11% African American, 1.21% Native American, 0.56% Asian, 0.09% Pacific Islander, 50.14% from other races, and 5.20% from two or more races. Hispanic or Latino of any race were 72.14% of the population.

There were 274 households, out of which 54.4% had children under the age of 18 living with them, 69.7% were married couples living together, 12.0% had a female householder with no husband present, and 11.3% were non-families. 8.8% of all households were made up of individuals, and 4.0% had someone living alone who was 65 years of age or older.  The average household size was 3.93 and the average family size was 4.12.

In the CDP, the population was spread out, with 35.8% under the age of 18, 9.6% from 18 to 24, 31.8% from 25 to 44, 16.5% from 45 to 64, and 6.2% who were 65 years of age or older.  The median age was 28 years. For every 100 females, there were 102.1 males.  For every 100 females age 18 and over, there were 105.0 males.

The median income for a household in the CDP was $47,841, and the median income for a family was $48,693. Males had a median income of $48,250 versus $21,250 for females. The per capita income for the CDP was $11,710.  About 14.0% of families and 14.9% of the population were below the poverty line, including 8.9% of those under age 18 and none of those age 65 or over.

Government

Water infrastructure
The groundwater is polluted by nitrates so that it is treated by ion exchange before being used as drinking water.

References

Census-designated places in Stanislaus County, California
Census-designated places in California